Palm grass is a common name for several plants and may refer to:

Molineria capitulata
Setaria palmifolia